Krummacher is a German surname. It may refer to:

 Emil Wilhelm Krummacher (1798–1886), German clergyman
 Friedhelm Krummacher (born 1936), German musicologist
 Friedrich Adolf Krummacher (1767–1845), German theologian
 Friedrich Wilhelm Krummacher (1796–1868), German clergyman
 Gottfried Daniel Krummacher (1774–1837), German clergyman
 Hermann Friedrich Krummacher (1828–1890), German author and government official
 Johann-Henrich Krummacher (1947–2008), German politician and clergyman

See also 

 Karl Krumbacher

Surnames
Surnames of German origin